Požega is a small village near Novi Pazar, Serbia. The population is 523 (census 2002).

A tributary of the Raska Ljudska flows through Požega. 

Populated places in Raška District